Yoshimi Niizeki (born 29 September 1954) is a Japanese professional golfer.

Niizeki played on the Japan Golf Tour, winning twice.

Professional wins (5)

Japan Golf Tour wins (2)

Japan Golf Tour playoff record (2–1)

Japan Challenge Tour wins (2)
1998 Daiwa Cup Yamanashi Open
1999 Aiful Challenge Cup Spring

Other wins (1)
1990 Kuzuha International

Team appearances
Kirin Cup (representing Japan): 1988
World Cup (representing Japan): 1989

External links

Japanese male golfers
Japan Golf Tour golfers
Sportspeople from Yamagata Prefecture
1954 births
Living people